Burrungule is a locality in South Australia.

Most of the locality is in the District Council of Grant, however the northernpart is in the Wattle Range Council. It is traversed by both the Princes Highway and the former Mount Gambier-Beachport railway line which closed to freight in April 1995 and tourist services 1 July 2006.

The locality derives its name from the former railway siding. In turn, the siding derived its name from an Aboriginal word for currant bush, also the name of a legendary hero.

The 2016 Australian census which was conducted in August 2016 reports that Burrungule had a population of 107 people.

References

Towns in South Australia
Limestone Coast